Relations between Turkmenistan and Pakistan were established after Turkmenistan became independent from the Soviet Union.

History 
Pakistan was one of the first countries to recognize the independence of Turkmenistan in December 1991. Formal diplomatic relations were established on 10 May 1992. In October 1994, Pakistani Prime Minister Benazir Bhutto made her first ever state visit to Turkmenistan. In October 1997, Pakistani Prime Minister Nawaz Sharif visited Ashgabat. To celebrate the 10th anniversary of Turkmenistan's independence in 2001 Pakistan issued stamps bearing the flag of Turkmenistan. In May 2017, Pakistani Prime Minister Nawaz Sharif and Turkmen President Gurbanguly Berdimuhamedow held a meeting that marked 25 years since the establishment of diplomatic relations.

Country Comparison

Strategic ties 
Pakistan has accorded approval to Turkmenistan for access to the warm water Gwadar Port as well as Iran and Russia, thus providing Turkmenistan direct access to the Arabian Sea.

Economic ties 
As part of the China-Pakistan Economic Corridor, Pakistan finalized land routes in January 2016 designed to provide access to Central Asian states, such as Turkmenistan to Pakistan. Both Turkmenistan and Pakistan are members of the Economic Cooperation Organization.
In November 2016, Pakistan joined the Ashgabat Agreement which aims to export Turkmen gas throughout the region in addition to the Lapis Lazuli corridor designed to facilitate trade.

Pakistan affirmed its commitments to Turkmenistan in a Sustainable Transport conference where Pakistan affirmed that "Regional connectivity, economic integration are key pillars of Pakistan's foreign policy."

Prime Minister Nawaz Sharif stated during a meeting with President Gurbanguly Berdimuhamedow declared that "Pakistan's priority is to expand trade and economic relations".

See also
 Turkmen in Pakistan
 Turkmenistan–Afghanistan–Pakistan–India Pipeline

References

External links
 The Security of the Caspian Sea Region

 
Turkmenistan
Bilateral relations of Turkmenistan